Oleksandr Valeriyovych Yakymenko (born 4 March 1989) is a Ukrainian football forward. He is the product of the Chornomorets Odesa school system and played for the reserve squad and youth squad until 2008/2009 season. Yakymenko was also a member of the Ukraine national under-21 football team.

On 25 February 2011, it was announced that Yakymenko would join Dniester on loan for the remainder of the 2010–11 season.

References

External links 
 
 
 Profile on Official Website

1988 births
Living people
Footballers from Odesa
Ukrainian footballers
FC Chornomorets Odesa players
FC Chornomorets-2 Odesa players
FC Dnister Ovidiopol players
FC Kramatorsk players
FC Real Pharma Odesa players
FC Bukovyna Chernivtsi players
Ukrainian Premier League players
Ukrainian First League players
Ukrainian Second League players
Ukrainian expatriate footballers
Expatriate footballers in Kazakhstan
Ukrainian expatriate sportspeople in Kazakhstan
Association football forwards